Međani is a village in the municipality of Prijepolje, Serbia. According to the 2002 census, the village has a population of 80 people.

See also
Populated places of Serbia

References

Populated places in Zlatibor District